Michael W. Twitty (born 1977) is an African-American Jewish writer, culinary historian, and educator. He is the author of The Cooking Gene, published by HarperCollins/Amistad, which won the 2018 James Beard Foundation Book Award for Book of the Year as well as the category for writing. The book was also a finalist for The Kirkus Prize in nonfiction, the Art of Eating Prize and a Barnes and Noble New Discoveries finalist in nonfiction.

Early life and education

Twitty was born in Washington, D.C., in 1977 to parents William Lee Twitty and Patricia Anita Townsend. He is of Mende, Akan and Irish descent. His Irish ancestors were enslavers; Twitty wrote an article for the Guardian explaining how he discovered his Irish ancestry through a combination of genetic testing and historical records. Twitty's great-great grandfather, Elijah Mitchell, was on a nearby street when Robert E. Lee surrendered to Ulysses S. Grant at the Appomattox Court House, ending the American Civil War.

Twitty first became interested in traditional cooking as a child when he went on a trip to Colonial Williamsburg. He majored in African-American studies and anthropology at Howard University, but did not finish due to financial constraints.

Career 
In 2010, Twitty launched Afroculinaria, a culinary history blog that covers African and African-American foodways.  In 2010, Twitty worked with the D. Landreth Seed Company to compile the African American Heritage Collection of heirloom seeds for the company's 225th anniversary. The collection features roughly 30 plants, including the long-handled dipper gourd and the fish pepper, showcasing how instrumental they were to African-American survival and independence. In 2011, he began his "Cooking Gene" project, which would form the basis for his 2017 James Beard Award-winning book The Cooking Gene.  His second book, Kosher Soul, was published in 2022.

Twitty founded and oversees the Southern Discomfort Tour, a journey through the American South designed to raise awareness about the impact racism had on Southern cuisine.  As part of this project, Twitty recreates the experiences of his slave ancestors, picking cotton, chopping wood, working in fields, and cooking in plantation kitchens.

In 2013, Twitty gained greater media attention when he published an open letter to Paula Deen after she was fired from the Food Network. That same year he spoke at the MAD symposium in Copenhagen after being invited by Rene Redzepi, owner of NOMA. In 2016, he traveled to Vancouver to give a TED talk entitled "Gastronomy and the social justice reality of food". In 2016, Twitty received the inaugural Culinary Pioneer Award from Tastetalks and won both readers choice and editors choice for his letter to chef Sean Brock on Afroculinaria from Saveur. In January 2017, Colonial Williamsburg named Twitty its first Revolutionary in Residence.

Twitty has become an icon in his efforts to change food and culinary injustices that have been a prevalent problem in African American communities and traces to African roots to help the public understand how African-American food shaped American cuisine.

In January 2023 airing of The African Americans, Many Rivers to Cross, Twitty is interviewed by the creator of the series, Henry Louis Gates.

Personal life
Twitty is openly gay. He was raised nominally Christian and converted to Judaism at age 25. He married Taylor Keith on October 1, 2020.

References

External links
 Afroculinaria, Michael W. Twitty's blog

  
 

1977 births
Living people
21st-century American educators
21st-century American historians
21st-century American male writers
21st-century American writers
African-American bloggers
African-American educators
African-American historians
African-American Jews
African-American non-fiction writers
American food writers
American male bloggers
American bloggers
American male writers
Converts to Judaism
Educators from Washington, D.C.
Food historians
American gay writers
James Beard Foundation Award winners
Jewish American historians
Jewish bloggers
LGBT African Americans
LGBT Jews
LGBT people from Washington, D.C.
People from Washington, D.C.
Soul food
Writers from Washington, D.C.
American male non-fiction writers
21st-century African-American writers
21st-century American Jews
20th-century African-American people
African-American male writers
LGBT chefs
African-American chefs
American cookbook writers
American people of Akan descent
American people of Mende descent
American people of Irish descent
Howard University alumni